The 1999 Bausch & Lomb Championships singles was the singles event of the twentieth edition of the Bausch & Lomb Championships; a WTA Tier II tournament held in Amelia Island, Florida, United States, played on green clay. Mary Pierce was the defending champion but lost in the quarterfinals to Conchita Martínez.

Monica Seles won in the final 6–2, 6–3 against Ruxandra Dragomir.

Seeds
The top eight seeds received a bye to the second round.

Draw

Finals

Top half

Section 1

Section 2

Bottom half

Section 3

Section 4

Qualifying

Seeds

Qualifiers

Lucky losers

Qualifying draw

First qualifier

Second qualifier

Third qualifier

Fourth qualifier

Fifth qualifier

Sixth qualifier

Seventh qualifier

Eighth qualifier

External links 
 ITF tournament edition details

Amelia Island Championships
Bausch and Lomb Championships